The Phragmidiaceae are a family of rust fungi in the order Pucciniales. The family contains 14 genera and 164 species.

Genera
Arthuriomyces
Frommeella
Gerwasia
Gymnoconia
Hamaspora
Joerstadia
Kuehneola
Mainsia
Morispora
Phragmidium
Physonema
Scutelliformis
Trachyspora
Xenodochus

References

External links

Pucciniales
Basidiomycota families
Taxa named by August Carl Joseph Corda
Taxa described in 1837